Shahrak-e Vali-ye Asr or Shahrak-e Valiasr or Shahrak-e Vali Asr may refer to various places in Iran:
 Shahrak-e Vali Asr, Ardabil
 Shahrak-e Vali-ye Asr, Darab, Fars Province
 Shahrak-e Vali-ye Asr, Marvdasht, Fars Province
 Shahrak-e Vali-ye Asr, Ilam
 Shahrak-e Vali-ye Asr, Darreh Shahr, Ilam Province
 Shahrak-e Vali-ye Asr, Isfahan
 Shahrak-e Vali-ye Asr, Khuzestan
 Shahrak-e Vali-ye Asr, Kohgiluyeh and Boyer-Ahmad
 Shahrak-e Vali-ye Asr, Lorestan
 Shahrak-e Vali-ye Asr, Markazi